Magnet is a former settlement in Madera County, California.

A post office operated at Magnet from 1900 to 1907. The name came from the Magnet mine.

References

Former settlements in Madera County, California
Former populated places in California